Pyritz may refer to:

Pyritz, German name of Pyrzyce, a town in Pomerania, northwestern Poland
Anja Pyritz (born 1970), German rower
Dana Pyritz (born 1970), German rower
Lutz Pyritz (1950–2018), German jockey and horse trainer
Tim Pyritz (born 1993), German diver 
Pyritzans, also known as Prissani, a medieval tribe in Pomerania
Treaty of Pyritz, 1493 treaty that settled claims of the House of Pomerania and the House of Hohenzollern regarding the legal status and succession in the Duchy of Pomerania